Altwood Church of England School is the only Church of England secondary school in Maidenhead.

Altwood School is an academy. The school draws pupils from across Maidenhead, Berkshire and Buckinghamshire.

History
Boyn Hill Church of England Senior Girls School (1836–1907) and St Lukes Church of England Secondary Boys School (1836–1907) both shared the present site of Altwood School. In 1907 the two schools merged to produce a coeducational school called Altwood Church of England Secondary School.

Altwood School became a comprehensive school in 1975. In 2007 it became a Business and Enterprise College specialist school. The school converted to academy status in August 2012.

Logo
Originally when Altwood was formed the school used a logo of a tree, in September 2010 the logo was updated along with a new website.

In September 2011 parts of a new uniform had been introduced with a different tie for boys and a specialised skirt for girls.

In September 2012, along with the new tie and skirt, the Altwood logo for both the uniform and the school was changed. The logo now has a cross with a tree slightly similar to the one on previous uniform beside it.

References

Secondary schools in the Royal Borough of Windsor and Maidenhead
Church of England secondary schools in the Diocese of Oxford
Educational institutions established in 1907
1907 establishments in England
Maidenhead
Academies in the Royal Borough of Windsor and Maidenhead